John 'Mackey' McKenna (born 1938 in Borrisokane, County Tipperary) is an Irish sportsman.  He played hurling with his local clubs Borrisokane and Burgess and was a member of the Tipperary senior inter-county team from 1961 until 1968. McKenna won four All-Ireland titles, five Munster titles and one National Hurling League title with Tipperary.

References

1938 births
Living people
Burgess hurlers
Borrisokane hurlers
Tipperary inter-county hurlers
Munster inter-provincial hurlers
All-Ireland Senior Hurling Championship winners
People from Borrisokane